Diomede Carafa (1492–1560) was an Italian Roman 
Catholic bishop and cardinal.

Biography

A member of the House of Carafa, Diomede Carafa was born in Ariano on 7 January 1492, the son of the noble House of Carafa.  He was a relative of Giovanni Pietro Carafa, who became Pope Paul IV.

After studying law, he worked for various Roman tribunals.

On 9 April 1511 he was elected Bishop of Ariano, with dispensation for not having reached the canonical age or having received Holy Orders.

Pope Paul IV made him a cardinal priest in the consistory of 20 December 1555.  He received the red hat and the titular church of San Martino ai Monti on 13 January 1556.

He participated in the papal conclave of 1559 that elected Pope Pius IV.

He died in Rome on 12 August 1560.  He was buried in his titular church.

References

1492 births
1560 deaths
16th-century Italian cardinals
Diomede
Bishops of Ariano
People from Ariano Irpino
16th-century Italian Roman Catholic bishops